Women on Top: How Real Life Has Changed Women's Sexual Fantasies is a 1991 book by Nancy Friday. In it she continues her research into women's sexual fantasies, following on from My Secret Garden and Forbidden Flowers. The book is divided into three sections: A "Report from the erotic interior", a section on masturbation, and the fantasies themselves. The fantasies in turn are divided into three chapters: 

Seductive, Sometimes Sadistic, Sexually Controlling Women
Women With Women
Insatiable Women: The Cry For "More!"

References

1991 non-fiction books
English-language books
Non-fiction books about sexuality